Corning Airport may refer to:
Elmira-Corning Regional Airport, Elmira, New York

See also
Corning Municipal Airport (disambiguation)